Rouse High School was established in 2008 by the Leander Independent School District in Leander, Texas to relieve overcrowding in the quickly growing district. It is named after Charles Rouse, a former principal at Leander High School. When the school first opened in 2008, it had only a freshman class. However, in its fourth year, the school was opened to seniors, juniors, sophomores, and freshman, which eventually lead to them growing to a 5A classification under the UIL format. In 2011, the school was rated "Academically Acceptable" by the Texas Education Agency.  By 2015 it had an enrollment of 2,391 students.

References

External links
Official school website

High schools in Williamson County, Texas
Educational institutions established in 2008
Leander, Texas
Leander Independent School District high schools
2008 establishments in Texas